The Philippine one thousand-peso note (Filipino: Sanlibong Piso) (₱1000; PHP1000) is a denomination of Philippine currency. It is the largest denomination in general circulation in the Philippines. It is currently the only Philippine peso denomination that has a polymer banknote version.

The cotton-abaca version, features José Abad Santos, Vicente Lim, and Josefa Llanes Escoda on the front side of the notes, while the Tubbataha Reefs Natural Park and the South Sea pearl are featured on the back side of the note.

The polymer version, first issued in April 2022 features the Philippine eagle on its obverse side while its reverse side has similar design elements with the cotton-abacá version.

History

Pre-independence

Japanese government issued series 
In 1948, due to hyperinflation caused by the ongoing event of World War II, the Japanese were forced to issue higher denominations of their fiat peso. The banknotes ceased becoming legal tender after the liberation.

Independence

New Design series (1991–2012) 
The Central Bank of the Philippines introduced the one thousand peso denomination in December 1991. The note features the portraits of former Chief Justice José Abad Santos; Josefa Llanes Escoda, civic worker and one of the founders of the Girl Scouts of the Philippines; and Vicente Lim, a general in the Philippine Army who was the first Filipino graduate of West Point. The three are considered heroes of the resistance against the Japanese occupation of the Philippines. The obverse also features the eternal flame and laurel leaves. The note is predominantly blue in color. The reverse features the Banaue Rice Terraces, Manunggul Jar cover, and Langgal (a mosque), representing the three island groups of the Philippines (Luzon, Visayas, and Mindanao, respectively). This is also the only note for the series that uses optically variable ink. The banknote was designed by Romeo Mananquil.

After the creation of the Bangko Sentral ng Pilipinas, its new logo was incorporated on all the New Design series bills in 1993.

In 1998, the year of printing was added at the bottom of the denomination value located at the upper left corner of the obverse.

In 1999, the signature of the Philippine president was moved slightly to the left to accommodate the names of the signatories on the bills and added them starting with banknotes featuring the signature of President Joseph Estrada.

In 2001, additional security features were added, such as the optically variable ink used for the "1000" on the lower left side of the obverse. Other features that were added are the security thread on the right side and the fluorescent printing on the left side across the portrait. To deplete the BSP's inventory of cotton-linen banknote paper, banknotes featuring the signatures of President Gloria Macapagal Arroyo and BSP governor Rafael Buenaventura were introduced earlier than the features mentioned before which makes the only banknote with the 2001 year mark to not feature the signature of President Joseph Estrada.

New Generation Currency series (2010–present) 
The portraits of Abad Santos, Escoda, and Lim were revised, and a scene from the Centennial celebration of Philippine independence was added on the lower left and an image of the Order of Lakandula medal (mislabeled as the "Medal of Honor") in the lower middle. The reverse now features the Tubbataha Reefs Natural Park and the South Sea pearl.

In 2017, an updated version of the 1000-peso banknote was released with changes in the font size of the year of issue and the italicization of the scientific name on the reverse side. The image of the Order of Lakandula and its description on the front side of the note were also removed.

In 2018, additional security features in the 1000 peso note, a blue 5mm-wide "3D security thread" (trademarked "Motion" by Crane Currency).

In 2020, an enhanced version of the 1000 peso "New Generation Currency" banknote was released. Four notable changes were made. First, it added color-changing indigenous patterns to the security threads. Second, a rolling bar effect was also added in the 1000 located at the upper-left corner. Third, the 1000 number located at the bottom-left were added with a color-changing feature depending on what angle it is tilted. Finally, ten tactile marks were placed for the elderly and the visually impaired, five tactile marks were placed on the extreme left and right side of the front of the note.

The new BSP logo which was redesigned in January 2021 was adopted in all NGC banknotes starting with the 2022 issued banknotes featuring the signatures of President Ferdinand Marcos Jr. and BSP Governor Felipe Medalla.

Polymer version (2022) 
In mid-2021, the Bangko Sentral ng Pilipinas announced that new polymer bills featuring the flora and fauna of the country will be in circulation. The portraits of Escoda, Abad Santos and Lim were replaced by a portrait of a Philippine Eagle. Reactions to the design were mixed, with the descendants of Escoda, Abad Santos, and Lim all criticizing the decision as disrespectful to their memory and urging the BSP to retain the three portraits in the new bill. Other critics viewed the redesign as the first step in the removal of the portraits of Senator Benigno Aquino and President Corazon Aquino on the 500 peso bill.

Commemorative issues 
Throughout its existence, the one thousand peso bill have been overprinted to commemorate certain events, namely:

60 years of Central Banking commemorative bill 
On July 9, 2009, the Bangko Sentral ng Pilipinas introduced 12 million banknotes (2 million banknotes for each denomination) with an overprint commemorating 60 years of central banking. The overprint appears on the watermark area on all six circulating denominations.

Printing years

References 

Banknotes of the Philippines
One-thousand-base-unit banknotes